Postmodern horror is a horror film related to the art and philosophy of postmodernism.

Notable postmodern horror films
Dead of Night (1945)
Spider Baby (1967)
Night of the Living Dead  (1968)
Targets (1968)
The Texas Chainsaw Massacre (1974)
House (1977)
Halloween (1978)
Dawn of the Dead (1978)
Invasion of the Body Snatchers (1978)
The Brood (1979)
The Shining (1980)
The Howling (1981)
The Entity (1982)
The Thing (1982)
Videodrome (1983)
The Toxic Avenger (1984)
A Nightmare on Elm Street (1984)
Re-Animator (1985)
Fright Night (1985)
Chopping Mall (1986)
Evil Dead II (1987)
Beetlejuice (1988)
Lady in White (1988)
Henry: Portrait of a Serial Killer (1990)
Candyman (1992)
Wes Craven's New Nightmare (1994)
From Dusk till Dawn (1996)
Scream (1996)
I Know What You Did Last Summer (1997)
Bride of Chucky (1998)
The Blair Witch Project (1999)
American Psycho (2000)
Final Destination (2000)
Scary Movie (2000)
Party Monster (2003)
Shaun of the Dead (2004)
Drag Me to Hell (2009)
The Cabin in the Woods (2012)
ParaNorman (2012)
Hotel Transylvania (2012)
The Final Girls (2015)
Get Out (2017)
Us (2019)
Midsommar (2019)
Last Night in Soho (2021)
Nope (2022)

Directors associated with postmodern horror
Jordan Peele
Robert Rodriguez
Ari Aster 
Sam Raimi
Lloyd Kaufman
John Carpenter
Wes Craven
David Cronenberg
George A. Romero
Stuart Gordon
Tobe Hooper
Joe Dante
Edgar Wright
Stanley Kubrick
Tim Burton

See also
Postmodernist film
Postmodern television
Social thriller
Extreme cinema
Vulgar auteurism
Art horror
Folk horror
American New Wave
Indiewood

References

Further reading
Prince, Stephen  The Horror Film, Rutgers University Press 2012

Postmodern art
1960s in film
1970s in film
1980s in film
1990s in film
2000s in film
2010s in film
2020s in film
Film genres
Horror films by genre
2010s in animation